Parasite is the name of several supervillains appearing in American comic books published by DC Comics. Each version of the character has the ability to temporarily absorb the life-energy, superpowers, and knowledge of others. The most recurring Parasite is Rudy Jones, who is a main adversary of Superman and belongs to the collective of enemies that make up his rogues gallery. In 2009, Parasite was ranked as IGN's 61st Greatest Comic Book Villain of All Time.

The Rudy Jones incarnation of the Parasite has been substantially adapted from the comics into multiple forms of media, most notably in the DC Animated Universe's Superman: The Animated Series and Justice League. He has also been portrayed in live-action television by Brendan Fletcher in Smallville. Different versions of Parasite appeared in TV shows set in the Arrowverse, with William Mapother portraying Rudy Jones in the second season, Anthony Konechny portraying Raymond Jensen in the fourth season of Supergirl, and Rya Kihlstedt portraying a variation of Alexandra Allston renamed Ally Allston in the second season of Superman & Lois.

Publication history
The Raymond Maxwell Jenson version of the Parasite first appeared in Action Comics #340 (August 1966) and was created by Jim Shooter. Shooter, who began working for DC at age 13, says that his inspiration for the villain was learning about parasites in his ninth-grade biology class.

The Rudy Jones version of the Parasite first appeared in Firestorm (vol. 2) #58 and was created by John Ostrander and Joe Brozowski.

The Alex and Andrea Allston versions of the Parasite first appeared in The Adventures of Superman #633 and were created by Greg Rucka, Matthew Clark, and Andrew Lanning.

The Joshua Allen version of the New 52 Parasite first appeared in Superman (vol. 3) #23.4 and was created by Aaron Kuder.

Fictional character biography

Raymond Jensen

In the Pre-Crisis, Raymond Maxwell Jensen was a lowlife who got a job as a plant worker for a research center. Wrongly believing that the company payrolls were hidden in storage containers, Jensen opened one and was bombarded with energies from biohazard materials (which was actually waste collected by Superman when he traveled into outer space), which transformed him into a purple-skinned, parasitic entity, and thus he became the Parasite. Any time he touched someone, he could absorb their physical and mental properties. Touching Superman would instantly absorb a sizable fraction of his superhuman powers (it was established early on that he is not capable of acquiring the whole of Superman's powers). On one occasion, while attempting to absorb a greater portion of his adversary's powers than previously, his body disintegrated for a period of time due to the pressure in his cells. Despite these abilities, the Parasite became depressed because he could no longer embrace his wife and children. The Parasite made a number of reappearances before the Crisis, yet he never successfully found a means to permanently defeat Superman. Despite this, he had knowledge of his foe's alter ego and often used this to attack Clark Kent. Gaining sizable intellect from his multiple encounters with Superman, the Parasite devised the means to reanimate dormant plant remains left behind from the Earth-Two supervillain Solomon Grundy, creating a newer and stronger version of the creature to plague his adversary. On another occasion, the Parasite devised the means to transfer the powers of the hero Air Wave to the young hero's adversary Casey Jones temporarily.

The eventual fate of the Pre-Crisis version of the Parasite is briefly mentioned in the beginning of Superman: Whatever Happened to the Man of Tomorrow?, where Lois Lane talks about the fates of the various Superman villains. The Parasite is dead, having died while fighting his occasional partner-in-crime Terra-Man in what Lane refers to a "clash of egos". Terra-Man is killed in the battle as well.

Rudy Jones
Originally a menial slacker in the Post-Crisis, Rudolph "Rudy" Jones was transformed into the Parasite while working as a janitor at a Pittsburgh S.T.A.R. Labs facility. Unknown to anyone at the scene, the Lord of Apokolips, Darkseid, remembered the Pre-Crisis Parasite and manipulated Jones to become the modern version. He made Rudy think that a waste container might have held something valuable. He opened it and was exposed to strange radiation that changed his body into the hairless, green-skinned villain. Jones now had the ability to absorb the life energy of other people, leaving behind smoldering skeletons. This power was necessary for his survival, as his own body is in a constant state of hunger for energy that it cannot sustain on its own. During this time, Martin Stein, one half of the Firestorm Matrix (Ronnie Raymond being the other half) learned he was dying and decided to destroy all the nuclear weapons in the world. This did not sit well with Earth's governments, particularly the United States, who sent the Suicide Squad to Times Square where Firestorm was holding a press conference. Things quickly got out of control as the Squad and the Justice League, both intent on subduing Firestorm, fought one another, and the Parasite (who was brought on the mission against the protests of both Amanda Waller and Colonel Rick Flag Jr.) is released. He goes on a rampage and apparently kills Multiplex, only being brought under control by the cooperation of both teams. Later, he attacked the new Firestorm who easily subdued him and left him near death.

During one of his stints at Belle Reve Prison, doctors attempted to make him human again. Despite their intentions, the doctors only managed to change his skin color to the more familiar purple and also inadvertently increased his absorption power, enabling him to feed on other forms of energy, such as electricity and heat. After a number of years, the Parasite became involved in the plot to save Superman from overloading on solar energy. Rudy and Superman battled on the moon where Superman uncontrollably unleashed an immense blast of heat vision that the Parasite absorbed, causing him to mutate even further into a huge, hulking monster with teeth resembling a leech's. This mutation again increased Rudy's draining abilities, allowing him to absorb fast-moving objects' inertia, as well as making him impervious to telepathic attack to an unknown extent, since he could now drain energy through a mental link as he displayed when Dubbilex telepathically attacked him. His extra size and power did have a downside, however; he needed to absorb more energy more frequently to stay alive.

Unfortunately for a scientist who was tending to Rudy during one of his terms of imprisonment, he was tricked by Lex Luthor and somehow absorbed into the Parasite. This joining was different from Rudy's others as, apparently due to unspecified modifications to Rudy's physiology during this stint at S.T.A.R. Labs (although some sources speculate that the scientist's strength of character contributed to his 'survival'), he actually retained the scientist, Dr. Torval Freeman, as a part of his own mind. This combined intelligence made the Parasite even more menacing, given Freeman's superior intellect; however, just as the Parasite was about to finish off Superman (who he had drained almost to death), Superman was taken by the Tribunal and Dr. Freeman's wife intervened, convincing the Dr. Freeman persona to leave the Parasite (along with Dr. Freeman's body); after this, Rudy Jones' personality was back in control. He is later recruited by Morgan Edge to be part of the second Superman Revenge Squad. After Superman's powers were converted into energy-based ones, the Parasite returned to see what he could absorb from the Man of Steel. At this point in time, Superman was not in full control of what was happening with his powers and nearly killed the Parasite. Later, the Parasite returned once again to make trouble for Superman, but found himself facing off against Supergirl instead, absorbing some of her new angelic powers and nearly killing himself due to the 'divine judgment' of Supergirl's new 'wings'.

At one point, Rudy was contracted to help drain off a being named the Strange Visitor's excess electromagnetic energy, as she could not fully control it. This exposure to the Strange Visitor's power caused the Parasite to mutate again, giving him the ability to fully and permanently retain the intellects of all of his victims and also allowed him to maintain any stolen energy for up to 24 hours. Like Torval Freeman, Rudy also absorbed an unknown shapeshifter into his biology, granting him the permanent power to mimic the exact genetic makeup and appearance of his victims.

After he later escaped from S.T.A.R. Labs in the early 2000s, the Parasite began to form a plan to get back at Superman. He began stalking Lois Lane and Jimmy Olsen in an attempt to get to those closest to Superman. The Parasite had taken the form of one of his previous victims, an old man, and was run down in the pandemonium that evening when Lois came to his aid. Not realizing that she was actually in contact with the Parasite, a simple touch was all Rudy needed to get her knowledge of Superman. Rudy was surprised to learn from Lois Superman's secret identity. A new plan formed when he realized how close Superman actually was to Lois; the Parasite decided to take her place and tear him down emotionally by pretending to be a scorned Lois Lane, apparently even having an affair with Luthor in the process. When Clark attempted to confront Lois about her recent distance from him, in a fit of rage uncharacteristic of Lois Lane, Rudy punched Clark out of their apartment and into the streets of Metropolis. Shortly after this display, Superman got the Parasite to reveal himself in the guise of Lois Lane. Rudy could not handle the fact that anyone other than himself as the Parasite took down the Man of Steel. Just as the Parasite was about to lay the final blow to an exhausted Superman, Rudy drops, completely crippled by kryptonite poisoning he had drained from Superman, unbeknownst to either Rudy or Clark. Superman finally realized the reason he has felt so weak recently was because he was being constantly drained by the Parasite and also the victim of the mysterious kryptonite poisoning. When he asked Rudy how long he had pretended to be Lois, the Parasite related his story to the Man of Steel. In his final moments, he tells Superman that he still needed to have contact with Lois once every 24 hours to maintain his charade, confirming that she is still alive. He also told him that Lois loves him more deeply than he could ever know, and loves him in a way that nobody ever loved the Parasite. The Parasite died before he could tell Superman where Lois was imprisoned (Superman (vol. 2) #157). Although Superman initially tried to investigate himself, his efforts were hampered by a bout of kryptonite poisoning, and Steel was forced to contact Batman to help in the investigation. Accompanied by Superman, Batman tracked a spree of recent disappearances to the Parasite's hiding place, during which Superman gained a new insight into Batman's methods and actions, and Lois was soon found alive by the two heroes. Lex Luthor, with whom it is implied the Parasite had engaged in amorous, "extramarital" activity while in Lois' form, was infuriated when he learned of the Parasite's schemes. As such, Luthor went to great efforts to obtain the Parasite's remains.

In Justice League of America (vol. 2) #2, the Parasite is found to be holed up in St. Roch, Louisiana, where he uses his power-absorbing abilities to temporarily neutralize the powers of villains for a fee so they might evade detection during the course of criminal efforts.

In Action Comics Annual #10, a headshot of the Parasite was seen as part of "Superman's Top 10 Most Wanted" that bore a resemblance to the version seen in Justice. This version of the Parasite later appeared in Action Comics #759 wearing the Superman: The Animated Series-inspired costume the Parasite wore circa 2000, and is later seen as a member of the new Injustice League. It has not yet been revealed if this Parasite is the same that appeared in Justice League of America (vol. 2) #2, but he has been revealed to be a resurrected Rudy Jones by Lex Luthor in Superman: Last Son.

He can seen as a member of Libra's Secret Society of Super Villains.

In the New Krypton storyline where 100,000 Kryptionian refugees are freed from the bottle city of Kandor, the Kandorians decide to take it upon themselves to eliminate Superman's enemies. A group of Kandorians break the Parasite out of prison, killing several prison guards in the process and imprison the Parasite in the Phantom Zone. Superman freed the Parasite so he could be taken to Belle Reve, but the Parasite escaped.

The 2009-10 miniseries Superman: Secret Origin redefines the Parasite's origin. In this version, Rudy Jones is a janitor at the Daily Planet. One day, Lex Luthor chooses Rudy as part of a daily "LexCorp Lottery" in which he selects one person from the crowd formed outside the LexCorp building to provide them with a new life. Inside LexCorp, Rudy eats a donut which had been accidentally spilled with a purple toxic material (revealed in issue #5 to have been produced by extracting the radiation from kryptonite). This transforms him into the Parasite, subsequently going on a rampage in Metropolis until he is stopped by Superman. He was last seen in issue #5 to be in a holding cell in LexCorp tower, having been seen by both Lex and Lois Lane's father, General Sam Lane.

In 2016, DC Comics implemented another relaunch of its books called "DC Rebirth", which restored its continuity to a form much as it was prior to "The New 52". Parasite was seen sucking electricity from the power station until Superman arrives. Not wanting Superman's help, Parasite loses his power after the power station explodes and gets away. Parasite later tries to drain the energy from the hospital generators. Superman was able to subdue Parasite on the Moon.

Parasite was shown to have befriended Metallo at some point.

During the "Dark Nights: Death Metal" storyline, Parasite was with the other Superman villains when they witnessed the rampage of a version of Superman called Last Sun. Metallo asks Parasite if he would suck the powers out of Last Son. He turned down that suggestion claiming that Last Sun's powers would be too dangerous for him.

Jimmy Olsen once recaps to Lois about the time when Superman took on Parasite, Lex Luthor, Mongul, Silver Banshee, Bizarro, and Metallo while protecting innocent bystanders.

Parasite later appears as a member of the Suicide Squad.

Alex and Alexandra Allston
After the villain Ruin (who was secretly Professor Hamilton) performed some experiments, two new Parasites debuted, one purple, the other green. The two new Parasites were teenagers named Alex (the green Parasite) and Alexandra (the purple Parasite) who wanted to seek vengeance on the people who made their lives difficult. They were soon subdued by Superman after a battle.

After attempting to escape from a metahuman prison, Alex was killed by an OMAC while his sister Alexandra escaped and joined the Secret Society of Super Villains under Alexander Luthor Jr. (who was posing as Lex Luthor).

She is later one of the villains sent to retrieve the Get Out of Hell Free card from the Secret Six.

Joshua Allen
In 2011, The New 52 rebooted the DC Comics universe. Joshua Michael Allen was a misanthropic delivery boy who was caught in the middle of a battle between Superman and a giant parasite. Allen snapped and attacked the creature, electrocuting it and himself with a live wire. While at Star Labs to check his health from the encounter, their testing transformed him into a creature who constantly feels hunger for energy he obtains from people, leaving their molded skeletons. Tired of this kind of life, he tried to commit suicide and was rescued by Superman, from whom Allen absorbed energy like never before. This eased the pain and hunger he experienced, until his energy was depleted. Allen was imprisoned in Belle Reve.

During the "Forever Evil" storyline, Allen escaped and joined the Crime Syndicate of America's version of the Secret Society of Super Villains. The Parasite is defeated by an overload of energy.

Allen was later forced into the Suicide Squad.

Powers and abilities
All incarnations of the Parasite have the ability to temporarily absorb the life energy, superpowers, and knowledge of their victims through physical contact, and are also able to drain virtually any other form of energy and use it as a power source.

In particular, Rudy Jones is granted enhanced strength, intelligence, agility, durability, and reflexes by absorbing the energy of other beings. When Jones drains other superpowered individuals, he gains their abilities for a limited period of time until he "runs out of life-energy" and must seek a new victim to "feed on". He is shown to have a heightened sense of perception that allows him to detect the life force and power within other beings. While drawing the energy of ordinary humans is almost instantaneous, it takes a notably longer time in the case of immensely powerful beings, which gives the victim more time to react and free themselves from the Parasite's grip. Following an encounter with the Strange Visitor, however, the Parasite's powers were enhanced and enable him to retain the energy he takes for longer as well as granting Jones the ability to shapeshift; he can now physically morph into his victims right down to their DNA, being able to access their memories, gain their natural abilities, and mimic their voices. The Parasite's biggest weakness is that he also absorbs the weaknesses of his victims and cannot counter such susceptibilities even when he has other abilities that should do so; when he absorbed both Superman and Livewire's powers, he retained the latter's vulnerability to water despite possessing the former's near-invulnerability. The Parasite also maintains Superman's weaknesses, like kryptonite, even when the Parasite in addition already absorbed the powers of non-Kryptonians.

Other versions

All-Star Superman
An alternate version of the Parasite appeared in DC Comics' All-Star Superman #5 as an antagonist in the main subplot. He passes by Clark Kent who is interviewing Lex Luthor, a prisoner on Death Row at the 'Stryker's Island' prison. Clark is surprised to see the Parasite, and the entity feeds on Superman's ambient energy. This provides enough power for the Parasite to go on a murderous rampage. The sheer amount of energy causes the Parasite to evolve into little more than a body and a mouth. Clark uses subterfuge and his strength to ultimately defeat the creature. Lex believes his attempts actually helped.

Crossovers
The Parasite was one of the main characters in the second Marvel/DC crossover between Spider-Man and Superman. In this story, he was recruited by Doctor Doom as an agent in Doom's latest plan to conquer the world by wiping out all power sources but his own fusion reactor. Doom claimed that he needed the Parasite to function as an invincible bodyguard, capturing the Hulk and Wonder Woman and giving the Parasite a harness that would allow him to retain their powers for prolonged periods. However, Doom's true intention was to kill the Parasite by allowing him to absorb so much power that his cells would burst, causing the Parasite to, according to Doom's calculations, transform into a crystalline mass that would allow Doom to perfect the reactor by using its energy-manipulation abilities to control the reactor's power output. This plan was thwarted when the Parasite briefly absorbed Spider-Man's powers, causing his borrowed spider-sense to alert him to Doom's treachery before Doom could implement the final stage of his plan. Parasite was subsequently defeated by Superman using a gauntlet of Doom's that prevented the Parasite from absorbing his energy when he was attacked.

JSA: The Liberty Files
In the second JSA: The Liberty Files miniseries entitled JSA: The Unholy Three, the Parasite is a former KGB agent working freelance as a contract killer.

Justice
Justice features the faceless Pre-Crisis version of the Parasite as part of the Legion of Doom. While not identified by name in the story, it is revealed via Batman's computer files that this version of the Parasite is Raymond Maxwell Jensen. He first appears in issue #4 as part of a group of villains sent to kill Superman (alongside Bizarro, Solomon Grundy, and Metallo), draining Superman's powers before Metallo exposes Superman to his kryptonite heart. The quartet are soon defeated by Captain Marvel, who slams Metallo's heart into the Parasite to defeat him. Lex Luthor teleports to the group almost immediately after Marvel and Superman leave to the Batcave, literally scolding the group as he returns Metallo his heart, telling the Parasite he also gets Superman's weaknesses as well as his strengths. He is later seen giving Luthor an unconscious Supergirl. When the Justice League attacks the Hall of Doom, the Parasite initially attacks Aquaman using some of Supergirl's powers, hoping to take his powers, and threatens Mera's life, and is subsequently stabbed by Aquaman. Gold later tries to imprison him in his body, hoping to turn the Parasite into gold, but is distracted after Platinum is attacked by Metallo. After escaping, he takes Black Adam's powers and Metallo's heart to kill Superman, but he is still unable to beat the Man of Steel and is defeated by the lightning bolt from Black Adam saying Shazam!.

Kingdom Come
In the DC Kingdom Come alternate timeline, the Parasite is involved in the explosion that destroys Kansas. This incarnation of the Parasite is the Raymond Jensen version. Besieged by a group of metahumans led by Magog, the weakened Parasite desperately lashes out at Captain Atom, tearing through his outer shell and causing the Captain's nuclear energy to erupt. The ensuing explosion destroys everything within a large radius and annihilates over 1 million people. With the exception of Magog and the enormous hero Alloy, none of the metahumans involved in the battle, including the Parasite, are shown to survive.

Superman: Earth One
The Parasite is the primary antagonist in Superman: Earth One Volume Two, the sequel to Superman: Earth One. This incarnation of the Parasite is the Raymond Maxwell Jensen version. Raymond Jensen was a criminal who would do anything to get what he wanted, including murder. His backstory reveals that he has been sociopathic since childhood and delights in killing anyone or anything for pleasure. After an accident at S.T.A.R. Labs, he becomes a serial-killing metahuman with the ability to absorb energy and life force through physical contact and to convert that energy into health and power for himself. This increases his strength, durability, muscle mass, and allows him to project the energy as a weapon. By absorbing Superman's life force, he gains his powers and renders the Man of Steel powerless. Ray has a sister named Theresa Jensen, who believes that her brother is a consultant with a real estate firm, unaware of his status as a murderous criminal until his transformation.

Superman Family Adventures
In Art Baltazar's Superman Family Adventures, Otis from the Richard Donner Superman movies became this universe's Parasite. Lex grabs a purple rock from space that Otis keeps instead of throwing away, which takes over his body and allows him the Parasite's abilities. Rather than commit villainous acts, Otis focuses his efforts on living Superman's life and dubs himself the "Purple Superman" before Lois calls him the Parasite. Superman defeats him by putting oven mitts on his hands while avoiding Otis, causing Otis to eventually lose Superman's powers and tire out.

Superman: Red Son
In Superman: Red Son, an incarnation of the Parasite is one of various enemies of Superman created by Dr. Lex Luthor.

Injustice: Gods Among Us
The Joshua Michael Allen (modeled after the Rudy Jones version's appearance) version of the Parasite appears in Injustice: Gods Among Uss prequel comic. In Year Five, the Parasite is fighting against the Cyborg and Hal Jordan in Coast City until Superman arrives and takes him to the Sun, where he throws the Parasite in, apparently killing him.

Just Imagine...
In Stan Lee's Just Imagine..., a version of Parasite exists as an African-American female serial killer named Lucinda Radama. She's one of the death row criminals turned supervillains under the Reverend Darrk, alongside Brock Smith/Blockbuster and criminal Deke Durgan/Deathstroke.

Superman American Alien
Parasite has made a brief appearance in Superman American Alien #5 by Max Landis. It shows the tragic story of Rudy Jones, how he became an addict and eventually a "guest" of Lex Luthor, who slowly turned him into an energy-hungry monster. After a brief rampage inside Metropolis Mall, he is apprehended by Superman and (mistakenly) returned to Lex Luthor, from whom he escaped in the first place. This serves as an example of "humanizing" the character of Superman, showing that he has flaws and makes mistakes as any other person does.

In other media
Television
Live-action
 The Rudy Jones incarnation of Parasite appears in the Smallville episode "Injustice", portrayed by Brendan Fletcher. Rudolph "Rudy" Jones was a metahuman prisoner at the Black Creek facility before everyone was released by Tess Mercer. Not long after, Jones found himself recruited by Mercer into a team that she had hoped could become heroes. While training with the team and being sent to find Doomsday, Jones receives the codename "Parasite". However, several of the team members are killed, leading to Jones and the survivors betraying Mercer, only to be defeated by Clark Kent and the Green Arrow and taken into police custody.
 Two incarnations of Parasite appear in Supergirl. Both versions are the result of humans being possessed by an alien parasite called an Angon:
 Rudy Jones appears in the episode "Changing", portrayed by William Mapother. This version is an environmental scientist who is infected by an Angon that had laid dormant in an Arctic wolf's corpse and gains the ability to drain the life from his victims through physical contact. After being confronted by Supergirl, Alex Danvers, and the Martian Manhunter, Jones absorbs Supergirl and Manhunter's powers and transforms into a monster. Rechristening himself "Parasite", he goes on a rampage before Supergirl uses plutonium from a nuclear power plant to overload Jones and kill him. In the episode "Kara", Lex Luthor uses the Allstone Totems to create a copy of Parasite to help him fight the Super Friends before it explodes while fighting Danvers.
 Raymond Jensen appears in the fourth season, portrayed by Anthony Konechny. Introduced in the episode "American Alien", this version is a Department of Extranormal Operations (DEO) agent who despises aliens for wreaking havoc on National City. After leaving the DEO, he joins anti-alien activists Otis and Mercy Graves, who bring him to their benefactor Agent Liberty. Following the Graves' apparent deaths, Jensen volunteers to be exposed to an Angon obtained from the DEO. In the episode "Parasite Lost", Jensen becomes the new Parasite and uses his new energy-absorbing abilities to kill aliens. While targeting an alien medallion to keep his Angon alive and maintain his abilities, Jensen ends up comatose and taken into DEO custody.
 A character based on Alexandra Allston named Ally Allston appears in the second season of Superman & Lois, portrayed by Rya Kihlstedt as an adult and by Amber Taylor as a child. This version is a cult leader behind the Inverse Society/Method and connected to Bizarro World, which she had taken over with help from her Bizarro counterpart (also portrayed by Kihlstedt), and became an enemy of Bizarro as a result. She later merges with her Bizarro counterpart, gaining flight and the ability to drain energy, before setting out to merge Earth with Bizarro World, only to be stopped by Superman.

Animation
 Parasite appears in The New Adventures of Superman episode "The Pernicious Parasite". This version is a thief named I.C. Harris''', a balding man who specializes in stealing radioactive materials and lacks purple skin.

 Two incarnations of Parasite appear in series set in the DC Animated Universe (DCAU):
 The Rudy Jones incarnation of Parasite appears in Superman: The Animated Series, voiced by Brion James. This version is a S.T.A.R. Labs janitor who secretly helps fence Martin Lebeau steal barrels of purple chemicals from the facility. Amidst one of their heists however, Jones is covered in the chemicals and transforms into Parasite. Using his newly acquired energy-draining abilities, he goes on to battle Superman on two occasions and briefly join forces with Livewire before ending up in a coma and being remanded to Stryker's Island.
 Jones appears in the Justice League two-part episode "Secret Society", voiced by Brian George. Having recovered from his coma, he is recruited into Gorilla Grodd's Secret Society and fights the Justice League, only to be defeated by Wonder Woman.
 Jones makes minor, non-speaking appearances in Justice League Unlimited as a member of Grodd's expanded Secret Society. Prior to and during the events of the episode "Alive!", Lex Luthor takes command of the Society, but Grodd mounts a mutiny. Jones sides with the latter, but is frozen by Killer Frost and killed off-screen by Darkseid along with Grodd's other loyalists.
 A monstrous, future incarnation of Parasite appears in the episode "Epilogue", voiced by Marc Worden. This version is a member of a future version of the Society called the Iniquity Collective.
 The Raymond Jensen incarnation of Parasite appears in the Young Justice episode "Performance", voiced by Adam Baldwin.
 The Rudy Jones incarnation of Parasite appears in the Justice League Action episode "Power Outage", voiced by Max Mittelman. This version is capable of sprouting tentacles from his torso to absorb victims' powers.
 An unidentified Parasite makes a non-speaking appearance in the Harley Quinn episode "L.O.D.R.S.V.P." as a member of the Legion of Doom.

Film
 The Rudy Jones incarnation of Parasite makes a cameo appearance in Superman/Batman: Public Enemies.
 Parasite appears in All-Star Superman, voiced by Michael Gough. This version possesses infrared vision that allows him to identify energy sources and is on death row at Stryker's Island. While Clark Kent is at the prison to interview Lex Luthor and due to his cells being supersaturated by yellow solar radiation, Parasite absorbs Kent's excess energy from afar and goes on a violent rampage until Kent secretly defeats him.
 The Rudy Jones incarnation of Parasite appears in DC Super Hero Girls: Hero of the Year, voiced by Tom Kenny.
 The Rudy Jones incarnation of Parasite appears in Superman: Man of Tomorrow, voiced by Brett Dalton. This version is a decorated former U.S. Marine, a veteran of the Middle East, and a loving family man before he is exposed to a S.T.A.R. Labs biological weapon designed to absorb energy from anything it touches, which transforms him into a decaying energy vampire. Over the course of the film, he slowly transforms into a massive, near-mindless beast as he continues to absorb energy until Superman eventually appeals to Jones' humanity and the latter sacrifices himself to protect Metropolis from an exploding energy plant.

Video games
 The Rudy Jones incarnation of Parasite appears as a boss in Superman: Shadow of Apokolips, voiced again by Brian George.
 Parasite appears as a boss in Superman 64. This version is a member of the Superman Revenge Squad.
 Parasite appears as a boss in the Nintendo DS version of Superman Returns.
 The Rudy Jones incarnation of Parasite appears in DC Universe Online, voiced by Robert Faires. In the villain campaign, he and Lex Luthor join forces to capture Power Girl so the former can drain her energy while the latter gets her DNA. To further their plan, Luthor arranges for Parasite clones to attack Metropolis University and tasks the player with using mutagen he developed to turn metahuman students into weaker versions of Parasite called Leeches to help the original Parasite defeat Power Girl.
 The Rudy Jones incarnation of Parasite appears in Injustice: Gods Among Us as part of the Stryker's Island stage.
 The Rudy Jones incarnation of Parasite appears as a playable character in Lego Batman 3: Beyond Gotham, voiced by Travis Willingham.
 The Rudy Jones incarnation of Parasite appears as a playable character in Lego DC Super-Villains, voiced by Eric Bauza.

Miscellaneous
The Rudy Jones incarnation of Parasite appears in DC Super Hero Girls''.

See also
 List of Superman enemies

References

External links
 Parasite at Comic Vine

Villains in animated television series
Characters created by Greg Rucka
Characters created by Jim Shooter
Characters created by John Ostrander
Comics characters introduced in 1966
Comics characters introduced in 1987
Comics characters introduced in 2004
DC Comics metahumans
DC Comics supervillains
DC Comics male supervillains
DC Comics female supervillains
DC Comics television characters
Fictional characters with absorption or parasitic abilities
Fictional characters with dissociative identity disorder
Fictional humanoids
Fictional janitors
Fictional mass murderers
Fictional parasites and parasitoids
Twin characters in comics
Superhero television characters
Articles about multiple fictional characters
Suicide Squad members
Superman characters